Many of the installations of sulfur lamps were for testing purposes only, but there remain a few sites where the lamps are in use as the primary lighting source.  Perhaps the most visible of these would be the glass atriums in the National Air and Space Museum.

North America
Washington, D.C.
National Air and Space Museum
U.S. Department of Energy James V. Forrestal Building, Independence Avenue, SW — report #1 report #2
Gallery Place Metro Station (removed)
British Columbia
BC Hydro headquarters, Burnaby
California
Sacramento Municipal Utility District headquarters, Sacramento — report
Florida
Epcot
United States Postal Service Distribution Facility, Fort Lauderdale
Illinois
Shedd Aquarium Caribbean Reef, Chicago — report
Brookfield Zoo, Brookfield
Michigan
Chrysler Truck Assembly Plant, Warren
Nevada
Municipal Pool, Las Vegas
Ohio
State of Ohio's General Services Building, Columbus — report
Ohio State University Book Depository and Archives
Oregon
USPS Processing and Distribution Center, Portland — report
Utah
Hill Air Force Base — report

Europe

Austria
Ein Volumen aus Licht by Monika Gora, Vienna, a temporary art installation in 1995
Denmark
DONG (formerly Nesa) headquarters, Gentofte — report
Germany
Semperlux AG headquarters, Berlin, a combined heliostat and sulfur lamp system
TK Park, Westerholt — report
Italy
3M European Distribution Center, Carpiano — report
Sweden
Lund University Hospital, Lund
Midsommarkransen station, Stockholm Metro, Stockholm — report
Sundsvall-Härnösand Airport (Midlanda), Sundsvall
Sundsvall Post Terminal, Sundsvall — report

Asia

China
Government Office Building, Ningbo

References

Sulfur lamp installations
Gas discharge lamps